Raul Tyson Isac Dias Monteiro or Raul Isac (born 2 February 1988) is an East Timorese international footballer who currently plays as a defender for North Sunshine Eagles FC and the Timor-Leste national team.

Club career
For 4 years he played for the Victorian 3rd Division State League side North Sunshine Eagles FC. In 2012, he had a short stint with DPMM FC before signing with local East Timor side Dili United.

International career
He made his senior debut for Timor-Leste on 29 June 2011 in a match against Nepal during the 2014 FIFA World Cup qualifying rounds.

Personal life
Raul was born in Melbourne, Australia to Timorese parents who immigrated there. He studied at RMIT University of Melbourne.

References

1988 births
Living people
East Timorese footballers
Association football defenders
Timor-Leste international footballers
Australian expatriate soccer players
Australian people of East Timorese descent
Soccer players from Melbourne
Expatriate soccer players in Australia
Expatriate footballers in Brunei
DPMM FC players
East Timorese expatriate footballers
Australian expatriate sportspeople in Brunei
East Timorese expatriate sportspeople in Brunei
RMIT University alumni